Orléans South-Navan Ward (Ward 19) is a city ward in Ottawa, Ontario represented on Ottawa City Council. It is located in the east end of the city, encompassing the southern portion of the Orleans subdivision and surrounding rural areas. 

The ward contains the neighbourhoods of Chapel Hill South, Bradley Estates, Trailsedge, Chaperal, Avalon, Notting Gate, Notre-Dame-des-Champs, Navan, French Hill, Sarsfield, Leonard, Bearbrook, Vars, Carlsbad Springs and Canaan.

History

The ward was created following Cumberland's amalgamation into Ottawa in 2001, but was first contested in 2000. It was named Cumberland Ward until 2022. From 2006 until 2022, the ward contained the Orleans communities of Queenswood Heights, Mer Bleue, Avalon, Chaperal, Notting Hill, Fallingbrook, Navan as well as the rural areas of the former city of Cumberland and the village as well as the former villages of Sarsfield, Notre-Dame-des-Champs, Carlsbad Springs, Vars and Bearbrook.

Regional councillors
Wilfred Murray (1969-1972, Cumberland reeve)
Henri Rocque (1972-1980, Cumberland reeve)
Peter D. Clark (1980-1989, Cumberland mayor)
Brian Coburn (1989-1995, Cumberland mayor)
Robert van den Ham (1995-2000, Cumberland-Osgoode Ward)

City councillors
Prior to amalgamation, Cumberland Ward covered Bilberry and Heritage Wards on Cumberland City Council.

Phil McNeely (2001-2003)
Rob Jellett (2003-2010)
Stephen Blais (2010–2020)
Catherine Kitts (2020–present)

Election results

1969 Ottawa-Carleton Regional Municipality elections

1972 Ottawa-Carleton Regional Municipality elections

1974 Ottawa-Carleton Regional Municipality elections

1976 Ottawa-Carleton Regional Municipality elections

1978 Ottawa-Carleton Regional Municipality elections

1980 Ottawa-Carleton Regional Municipality elections

1982 Ottawa-Carleton Regional Municipality elections

1985 Ottawa-Carleton Regional Municipality elections

1988 Ottawa-Carleton Regional Municipality elections

1991 Ottawa-Carleton Regional Municipality elections

1994 Ottawa-Carleton Regional Municipality elections

 As Cumberland-Osgoode ward

1997 Ottawa-Carleton Regional Municipality elections

 As Cumberland-Osgoode ward

2000 Ottawa municipal election
Engineer Phil McNeely defeated regional councillor Robert van den Ham and Cumberland City Councillor David Lewis (Bilberry Ward).

2003 Ottawa municipal election

2006 Ottawa municipal election

2010 Ottawa municipal election

2014 Ottawa municipal election

2018 Ottawa municipal election

2020 by-election
There was a by-election held on October 5, 2020 to replace Blais who had been elected to the Legislative Assembly of Ontario earlier in the year.

Candidates
Yvette Ashiri - Hosts the television show Identité Cultur'Elles, is executive vice-president of Junior Chamber International Canada, chairs the École Élémentaire Publique des Sentiers council, sits on the governance committee of the Montfort Hospital, one of the lead organizers of the “No Justice No Peace” march. Endorsed by Kitchissippi Ward Councillor Jeff Leiper, Capital Ward Councillor, Shawn Menard, NDP MPP Joel Harden and Horizon Ottawa. 
Jensen Boire - Ran in this ward in the 2018 municipal election. 
A. Bruce Faulkner - ran for the Libertarian Party of Ontario in Ottawa Centre in the 2018 Ontario general election. Also ran in the 2014 municipal election in Kanata South Ward and in the 2019 Rideau-Rockcliffe Ward by-election.
Lyse-Pascale Inamuco - Director of Community Service for the Rotary Club of Orléans, co-Chair and former co-vice chair for Women's March Ottawa, Director at 613-819 Black Hub Noir. A former staffer for Liberal MPP Nathalie Des Rosiers. Endorsed by Des Rosiers and Liberal MP Greg Fergus, and Dr. Betsy McGregor.
Catherine Kitts - Former editor of the Orleans Star newspaper. As of 2016, Communications Officer at Carleton University. Member of Equal Voice. Came second out of 17 candidates in Orleans Ward in the 2018 municipal election. Now lives in Navan. Endorsed by Orleans Ward city councillor Matthew Luloff, Liberal MP Marie-France Lalonde, Liberal MPP Stephen Blais and former Liberal MPPs Madeleine Meilleur and Phil McNeely.
Denis Labrèche - President of the Carlsbad Springs Community Association.
Craig MacAulay - Ran for mayor in the 2018 municipal election.
Gina Mertikas-Lavictoire - Cancer fundraiser.
Mark Scharfe - Ran in Osgoode Ward for city council in the 2014 and 2018 elections. 
Patrick Uguccioni - Former Corporate Communication Strategist at the City of Ottawa. Managing editor of the Your Community Voice community newspapers. Endorsed by former mayors Larry O'Brien and Bob Chiarelli, former Progressive Conservative MPP Brian Coburn and former city councillor Doug Thompson.
Henry Valois - Ran in this ward in the 2006 municipal election.

Results

2022 Ottawa municipal election

References

External links
 Map of Cumberland Ward 

Ottawa wards